The following list comprises all anime that has been broadcast on TBS Television, its affiliates (like MBS, which has been affiliated with TBS since April 1, 1975), and related programming blocks like Animeism.

TV series (all)

1960s–70s

1980s

1990s

2000s

2010s

2020s

Films and specials
Toshishun (April 12, 1981)
Otoko wa Tsurai yo: Torajirō Wasure na Kusa (August 7, 1998)

See also
List of programs broadcast by TBS Television (Japan)

References

anime
Tbs
Tbs